The discriminant of a polynomial is a quantity that depends on the coefficients and determines various properties of the roots.

Discriminant may also refer to its various generalizations:

Mathematics
Discriminant of an algebraic number field
Discriminant of an elliptic curve
Discriminant of a quadratic form
Discriminant of a real-valued function
Fundamental discriminant
Modular discriminant

Medicine
Modified Maddrey's discriminant function

Psychology
Discriminant validity

Statistics
Discriminant analysis
Kernel Fisher discriminant analysis
Multiple discriminant analysis